The 1972–73 Segunda División season saw 20 teams participate in the second flight Spanish league. Real Murcia, Elche CF and Racing de Santander were promoted to Primera División. CD Logroñés, Pontevedra CF, Cultural Leonesa and CD Mestalla were relegated to Tercera División.

Teams

Final table

Results

Relegation playoff

Pichichi Trophy

External links 
  Official LFP Site

Segunda División seasons
2
Spain